Spermodea lamellata is a species of minute European land snail, a terrestrial gastropod mollusc, or micromollusc, in the family Valloniidae.

Description
For terms see gastropod shell''.

The 2-2.2 mm x 2-2.2 mm shell has a characteristic semispherical shape like a bee skep basket. The shell has 6 convex whorls which increase gradually in size. The sutures are deep. The whorls are decorated with very fine, very regular, radial ribs. These ribs function as a  diffraction grating, giving the yellow shell a silky appearance. The apertural margin is simple and breaks easily. There are no folds inside the aperture. The umbilicus is narrow. Juveniles are paler with weaker ribs at the lower side, and the umbilicus relatively wider.

Distribution
This species occurs in areas which include:
 Denmark
 Great Britain
 Ireland
 Czech Republic
 Northern Germany
 Netherlands - extinct
 Norway
 Poland - isolated locality
 Portugal - isolated localities in Serra de Bussaco mountains (in Beira Alta), and in Sintra
 Sweden
 Ukraine
 and other areas

Habitat
This minute snail lives in ancient woodland.

References

External links
Spermodea lamellata at Animalbase taxonomy,short description, distribution, biology,status (threats), images

Valloniidae
Gastropods described in 1830
Taxa named by John Gwyn Jeffreys